Maachha  Bihana is the roe of a fish made into dumpling by some spice paste and fried to make spicy curry.

Preparation
It is a typical dish prepared during monsoon season in coastal Odisha. The ova are collected from the sliced fish and a paste of black gram dal and spices are applied to make small balls. These balls are fried and made to a gravy based curry. Most popular is the Ilishi Maachha Bihana.

History
Recently, the environmentalist concerned the downfall in number of some species and creating awareness in restoring the fish population.

Indian fish dishes
Indian curries
Odia cuisine
Roe